Gerald Friedland (born 1978, Berlin) is an adjunct professor at the Electrical Engineering and Computer Science Department of the University of California, Berkeley. He also maintains an affiliation with the International Computer Science Institute.

Education 
Gerald Friedland completed his Masters and Doctorate degrees in computer science from Free University of Berlin in 2002 and 2006, respectively. His PhD advisor was Raúl Rojas. He then moved to the International Computer Science Institute where he completed his a postdoc under Nelson Morgan before continuing to be a research scientist and group leader there. He then worked as a Principal Data Scientist at Lawrence Livermore National Lab before co-founding Brainome, Inc. He is a faculty fellow of the Berkeley Institute for Data Science where he has been running a discussion group since 2018, understanding the implications of using information theory as universal tool for modeling.

Career 
Friedland is a computer scientist specializing in the processing and analysis of multimedia data and machine learning. He is mostly known as the original author of the widely used "Simple Interactive Object Extraction" image and video segmentation algorithm, created as part of his PhD thesis, and as the co-author of a textbook on Multimedia Computing. He also led the initiative to create and release the YFCC100M corpus (see also: List of datasets for machine learning research), the largest freely available research corpus of consumer-produced videos and images. He co-founded the field of geolocation estimation for images and videos, sometimes also referred to as placing. Friedland also frequently uncovers privacy risks in multimedia publishing practice and heads the development of the teachingprivacy.org portal which provides educational materials for use in US high-schools as part of the AP Computer Science Principles and the Code.org initiative. Friedland is also the co-creator of MOVI, an open-source speech recognition board that allows the creation of cloudless voice interfaces for Internet of things devices.

References 

1978 births
Living people
German electrical engineers
German computer scientists
Lawrence Livermore National Laboratory staff
UC Berkeley College of Engineering faculty
German expatriates in the United States
Free University of Berlin alumni